SK Horní Měcholupy is a Czech football club located in Prague-Horní Měcholupy. It currently plays in the Prague Championship.

Honours
Czech Fourth Division (fourth tier)
 Champions Divize A 2011–12
Prague Championship (fifth tier)
 Champions 2004–05, 2006–07

References

External links
  
 SK Horní Měcholupy at the website of the Prague Football Association 

Football clubs in the Czech Republic
Association football clubs established in 1932
Football clubs in Prague
1932 establishments in Czechoslovakia